National Defense Transportation Day is a United States Federal Observance Day observed on the third Friday in May.

History and definition
The observance was first signed into law by President Eisenhower in 1957.
According to 36 U.S.C. § 120, on National Defense Transportation Day, the president urges "the people of the United States, including labor, management, users, and investors, in all communities served by the various forms of transportation to observe National Defense Transportation Day by appropriate ceremonies that will give complete recognition to the importance to each community and its people of the transportation system of the United States and the maintenance of the facilities of the system in the most modern state of adequacy to serve the needs of the United States in times of peace and in national defense."

National Defense Transportation Week
National Defense Transportation Week is the week during which National Defense Transportation Day falls, and was established in 1962.

Celebration and observance
The week during which the day falls is often observed by a wide range of activities including poster contests for schools, educational expositions on transport, and programs with guest speakers.

History
On May 16, 1957, Congress designated the third Friday of May each year as National Defense Transportation Day. In 1962 Congress included the whole week within which the Friday falls as National Transportation Week.

Notes

May observances
Observances in the United States by presidential proclamation
Holidays and observances by scheduling (nth weekday of the month)